Vələsli or Velasli may refer to:
 Vələsli, Davachi, Azerbaijan
 Vələsli, Ismailli, Azerbaijan